Cosford may refer to the following places in England:

 Cosford, Shropshire, a village
 RAF Cosford, a Royal Air Force station, formerly DCAE Cosford
 Royal Air Force Museum Cosford
 Cosford Hundred, Suffolk, a former government administrative division
 Cosford Rural District, a former rural district in West Suffolk
 Cosford, Warwickshire, a village and civil parish
 Cosford (surname), list of notable people with the surname